Tangy may refer to:
Having a sour or pungent taste
Tangy Fruits, a New Zealand candy
Tangy Loch, Kintyre, Scotland
Tangy Wind Farm, see List of onshore wind farms in the United Kingdom